Hymenoxys biennis is a North American species of flowering plant in the daisy family. It is native to the state of Utah in the western United States.

References

External links
Photo of herbarium specimen at Missouri Botanical Garden, collected in Utah in 1877

biennis
Flora of Utah
Plants described in 1878
Flora without expected TNC conservation status